Sports + Travel Hong Kong is a free travel magazine based in Hong Kong and targeted at English readers. It is published bi-monthly.

References

External links 
 The Official Sports+Travel Hong Kong website

Adventure travel
Bi-monthly magazines
Free magazines
Magazines published in Hong Kong
Magazines with year of establishment missing
Chinese travel websites
Tourism magazines